{{Infobox comic book title
| image               = Batgirl and the Birds of Prey 22 Textless.jpg
| imagesize           =
| caption             = Textless artwork for issue #22. Art by Terry Dodson and Rachel Dodson.
| schedule            = Monthly
| ongoing             = y
| Superhero           = y
| publisher           = DC Comics
| date                =
| startmo             = September
| startyr             = 2016
| endmo               = July
| endyr               = 2018
| issues              = 22 + Rebirth one-shot
| main_char_team      = BatgirlBlack CanaryHuntress
| issn                =
| writers             = Julie BensonShawna Benson
| artists             =
| pencillers          = {{List collapsed|Rebirth #1; #1–3, 7Claire Roe#4–6, 8–13, 15, 19–22Roge Antonio#14, 16–18Marcio Takara}}
| inkers              = {{List collapsed|Rebirth #1; #1–3, 7Claire Roe#4–6, 8–13, 15, 19–22Roge Antonio#14, 16–18Marcio Takara}}
| letterers           = {{List collapsed|Rebirth #1; #1–2Steve Wands#3–8, 10, 16Deron Bennett#9, 11–15Josh Reed#17–18Dezi Sienty#19–22Saida Temofonte}}
| colorists           = {{List collapsed|Rebirth #1; #1–13Allen Passalaqua#14, 18Jordan Boyd#15–17, 19–22Marcelo Maiolo}}
| editors             = {{List collapsed|Rebirth #1; #1–13Chris Conroy#14–17Mike Cotton#18–22Katie Kubert}}
| creative_team_month =
| creative_team_year  =
| creators            =
| TPB                 = Who is Oracle?
| TPB1                = Source Code
| TPB2                = Full Circle
| ISBN                = 978-1401268671
| ISBN1               = 978-1401273804
| ISBN2               = 978-1401277819
| subcat              = DC Comics
| altcat              =
| sort                = Batgirl and the Birds of Prey
| nonUS               =
}}Batgirl and the Birds of Prey was a monthly ongoing American comic book series published by DC Comics and written by Julie Benson and Shawna Benson, starring the eponymous team. A one-shot was initially released in July 2016 as part of the DC Rebirth relaunch, before beginning publication as a monthly series in August. The series ran for 22 issues until May 2018.

Publication history
Announced as part of DC Rebirth, the title debuted in July 2016 with the one-shot Batgirl and the Birds of Prey: Rebirth #1, before being released monthly. The first story arc follows Batgirl, Black Canary and the Huntress as they battle the Snake Men and Oracle, a villain using Batgirl's former codename.

The series is written by Julie Benson and Shawna Benson. Claire Roe illustrated the Rebirth one-shot and the first three issues of the monthly series. Roge Antonio took over illustration duties beginning with issue #4, finishing the art for the remaining of the first story arc. Issue #22 was listed for release in May 2018 as the final issue, in which the team finally confronts Calculator.

Collected editions

Critical reception
The initial one-shot received an average score of 6.9/10 based on 32 critic reviews according to review aggregator Comic Book Roundup, while the overall series had a score of 6.9/10 based on the average of the 22 issues.

References

2016 comics debuts
2018 comics endings
Batgirl titles
Birds of Prey
Black Canary